Kilobyte (kB) is a decimalized unit measure of data storage, equalling 1000 bytes.

Kilobyte may also refer to:

 Kibibyte (KiB) an idiomatic unit measure of data storage equalling 1024 bytes, also called a "kilobyte" (KB)
 Kilobyte (Ace Lightning), a fictional character, a cyberstalker from Ace Lightning, see List of Ace Lightning characters
 Kilobyte (ReBoot), a fictional character from the CG animated TV fictional universe ReBoot, see List of ReBoot characters
 Kilobyte Magazine, former name of the computer magazine Kilobaud Microcomputing

See also
 K-Byte, a battery electric car from Sino-American marque Byton, see Future Mobility Corporation
 Killobyte (1993 novel) science fiction novel by Piers Anthony
 Kilobit (kb) 103 bits
 Kibibit (Kib) 210 bits
 Killabite (disambiguation)
 KB (disambiguation)
 Kilo (disambiguation)
 Byte (disambiguation)